The list of shipwrecks in August 1888 includes ships sunk, foundered, grounded, or otherwise lost during August 1888.

3 August

6 August

7 August

8 August

9 August

10 August

12 August

13 August

14 August

15 August

21 August

22 August

24 August

25 August

27 August

29 August

30 August

31 August

Unknown date

References

1888-08
Maritime incidents in August 1888